Iron Mountain is a  elevation summit located in the eastern Olympic Mountains in Jefferson County of Washington state. It is set within Buckhorn Wilderness, on land managed by Olympic National Forest. It is situated between Buckhorn Mountain,  to the southwest, and Mount Worthington,  to the northeast. Precipitation runoff from Iron Mountain drains south into the Big Quilcene River, and north into Copper Creek which is a tributary of the Dungeness River. Old-growth forests of Douglas fir, western hemlock, and western redcedar grow in the valleys surrounding the peak. The nearest community is Quilcene 11 miles to the east.

Climate

Iron Mountain is located in the marine west coast climate zone of western North America. Most weather fronts originate in the Pacific Ocean, and travel northeast toward the Olympic Mountains. As fronts approach, they are forced upward by the peaks of the Olympic Range, causing them to drop their moisture in the form of rain or snowfall (Orographic lift). As a result, the Olympics experience high precipitation, especially during the winter months in the form of snowfall. Because of maritime influence, snow tends to be wet and heavy, resulting in avalanche danger. During winter months, weather is usually cloudy, but, due to high pressure systems over the Pacific Ocean that intensify during summer months, there is often little or no cloud cover during the summer.

Geology

The Olympic Mountains are composed of obducted clastic wedge material and oceanic crust, primarily Eocene sandstone, turbidite, and basaltic oceanic crust. The mountains were sculpted during the Pleistocene era by erosion and glaciers advancing and retreating multiple times.

Gallery

See also

 Geology of the Pacific Northwest

References

External links
 Weather forecast

Mountains of Washington (state)
Olympic Mountains
Landforms of Jefferson County, Washington
North American 2000 m summits